General Israel Putnam is a monumental statue in Hartford, Connecticut, United States. Located in the city's Bushnell Park, the statue was designed by sculptor John Quincy Adams Ward and honors Israel Putnam, a military officer in the Continental Army during the American Revolutionary War. The statue was largely paid for by a donation from judge Joseph P. Allyn and was dedicated in a large ceremony in 1874. It was one of the first statues to be erected in the park, which nowadays houses several other monuments to famous Connecticut residents. From an artistic standpoint, the statue has received mixed reviews from critics.

History 
Israel Putnam was a military officer who served as a major general in the Continental Army during the American Revolutionary War. Born in Salem, Massachusetts in 1718, he moved to Connecticut in 1739 and died there in 1790, having become a folk hero in the state.

In 1869, Joseph P. Allyn, a judge from the state capital of Hartford, Connecticut, died. In his will he allocated US$5,000 to his father and two other men for the purposes of erecting a monument in honor of Putnam in Hartford's Bushnell Park. His father added an additional $5,000 of his own money and, in either 1872 or 1873, the trustees chose to commission sculptor John Quincy Adams Ward to design a statue of Putnam. The statue would be the first of six Revolutionary War sculptures Ward would create during his lifetime. R. M. Hunt of New York City designed an accompanying pedestal for the statue, which cost about $2,000 and was paid for by the city government of Hartford. Ultimately, the monument cost a total of at least $14,000. Ward completed the sculpture in 1873 while he was also working on some sculptures for the Connecticut State Capitol, located near Bushnell Park. Casting was performed by the Robert Wood & Company foundry in Philadelphia.

The monument was dedicated on June 17, 1874, in a large ceremony at the park. The dedication took place on the anniversary of the Battle of Bunker Hill (a Revolutionary War battle in which Putnam participated almost 100 years prior) and occurred during a wave of monument-building in the United States that honored both Revolutionary and Civil War-era figures. The statue would be one of the first to be erected in the park, coming several years after the erection of the first statue in the park, one of Bishop Thomas Church Brownell, in 1869.

In 1993, the monument was surveyed as part of the Save Outdoor Sculpture! project.

Design 

Putnam is dressed in his military garb from the Revolutionary War, including a frock coat and cravat, and is depicted in midstride. He is holding a sword by his side with his left hand, while his relaxed right hand holds onto a tricorne. According to an 1874 article in The Aldine, Ward modeled Putnam's face off of an ink portrait belonging to his descendants and a portrait created by John Trumbull. The base of the sculpture bears markings from the designer and foundry (J.Q.A. WARD / 1873 / R. WOOD & CO / BRONZE FOUNDERS. / PHILA.), while the front of the pedestal reads "ISRAEL PUTNAM" and the back bears the inscription "PRESENTED / BY THE HONOURABLE / JOSEPH PRATT ALLYN / MDCCCLXXIII".

Analysis 
Contemporary reviews of the statue were generally mixed. An 1888 article by T. H. Bartlett in The American Architect and Building News states that the public was disappointed in Ward's portrayal of Putnam, saying, "Artists, as well as the public, have criticized, justly, the position and character of the statue." However, a 1903 article by Amanda M. Flattery in The Bay View Magazine lists the statue among several other examples of Ward's "genius", including his equestrian statue of George Henry Thomas and statue of George Washington. The Bushnell Park Foundation, which oversees the park and administers the statue, observe that "[i]n Ward’s rendering of Putnam taking a step forward, he is no longer a static figure but a candid portrayal of a fleeting moment as the general strides forth", which lends "a more natural, spontaneous character and heightened the realism of his sculpture". They proceed to note that while the monument is "a radical departure from his work in the post-Civil War period, this statue marks a new and important dimension in his work".

Notes

References

Sources

External links 
 

1874 establishments in Connecticut
1874 sculptures
American Revolutionary War monuments and memorials
Bronze sculptures in Connecticut
Buildings and structures in Hartford, Connecticut
Outdoor sculptures in Connecticut
Sculptures of men in Connecticut
Statues in Connecticut
Tourist attractions in Hartford, Connecticut